Gonio fortress (previously called Apsarus or Apsaros and Apsyrtus or Apsyrtos (Ἄψυρτος)) is a Roman fortification in Adjara, Georgia, on the Black Sea, 15 km south of Batumi, at the mouth of the Chorokhi river.  The village sits 4 km north of the Turkish border. Its name was connected with the myth of Medea and her brother Absyrtus.

The oldest reference to the fortress is by Pliny the Elder in the Natural History (1st century AD). There is also a reference to the ancient name of the site in Appian’s Mithridatic Wars (2nd century AD). In the 2nd century AD it was a well-fortified Roman city within Colchis. The town was also known for its theatre and hippodrome. Procopius, writing in the 6th century, speaks of the remains of its public buildings as proving that it was once a place of some importance.

It later came under Byzantine influence. The name "Gonio" is first attested in Michael Panaretos in the 14th century. In addition, there was a short-lived Genoese trade factory at the site. In 1547, Gonio was taken by the Ottomans, who held it until 1878, when, via the San-Stefano Treaty, Adjara became part of the Russian empire. In the fall of 1647, according to Evliya Çelebi, Gonio was captured by a Cossack navy of 70 chaikas, but quickly recovered by Ghazi Sidi Ahmed, ruler of the Tortum sanjak, with a force of 1,000 Turks and 3,000 "Mingrelians".

The grave of Saint Matthias, one of the twelve apostles, is believed to be inside the Gonio fortress. This is unverifiable as the Georgian government currently prohibits digging near the supposed graveside.  Other archaeological excavations are however taking place on the grounds of the fortress, focusing on Roman layers.

Gonio is currently experiencing a tourism boom.  Most tourists come from Tbilisi in the summer months to enjoy beaches that are generally regarded as cleaner than Batumi's beaches (located 15 km to the north).

Further reading
 Radoslaw Karasiewicz-Szczypiorski: Apsaros. Early Headquarters Building (Principia). New Localization? In: Pro Georgia 26, 2016, S. 53-63.
 Shota Mamuladze: Recent archaeological finds in Apsarus. In: The Bosporus, Archaeopress, Oxford 2013, S. 355-361.
 Angelika Geyer (Hrsg.): Neue Forschungen in Apsaros, 2002–2002 (= Jenaer Forschungen in Georgien 1). Logos, Tbilissi 2003, .
 Angelika Geyer, Shota Mamuladze: Gonio-Apsaros. 3. Georgisch-deutsche archäologische Expedition Gonio-Apsaros. Erster vorläufiger Bericht, Arbeiten im Jahre 2000. Logos, Tbilissi 2002
 Annegret Plontke-Lüning: Das Kastell Apsaros als Zentrum der Akkulturation im Ostschwarzmeergebiet in Kaiserzeit und Spätantike. In: Archaeologia Circumpontica 1 (2003), p. 13-15.
 Annegret Plontke-Lüning: Das römische Kastell Apsaros. In: Georgica 17 (1994), p. 23-28. 
 Annegret Plontke-Lüning: Apsaros und der pontische Limes. In: La ciutat en el món romà. La ciudad en el mundo romano. 2. Comunicacions. 14 Congrés Internacional d'Arqueología Clàssica, Tarragona 1993, p. 336-337.
 Michael Alexander Speidel: The Caucasus Frontier. Second century garrisons at Apsarus, Petra and Phasis. In: Studien zu den Militärgrenzen Roms III, 13. Internationaler Limeskongress (Stuttgart 1986), p. 657-658.

Notes

References
Kakhidze, Emzar, Recent Archaeological Finds in Apsarus. Third International Congress on Black Sea Antiquities, 2005.
Pictures of Gonio castle

Buildings and structures in Adjara
Archaeological sites in Georgia (country)
Tourist attractions in Adjara
Batum Oblast
Castles and forts in Georgia (country)
Roman legionary fortresses in Georgia
Immovable Cultural Monuments of National Significance of Georgia
Roman fortifications in Cappadocia